Morris Vernon Green (born c. 1942) is a retired history teacher and former politician in the Province of New Brunswick, Canada.

In 1960, he graduated from Upper Miramichi Regional High School in Boiestown, New Brunswick. He married Peggy Robichaud.

A member of the New Brunswick Liberal Association, in the 1978 provincial election,  Morris Green was elected to the Legislative Assembly of New Brunswick as the representative for the  Southwest Miramichi riding. He was reelected in 1982 and 1987 and on October 27, 1987 was appointed the Cabinet by Premier Frank McKenna as Minister of Natural Resources.

Green served in Cabinet until August 31, 1991 and did not seek reelection in that year's general election.

References
  Government of New Brunswick Cabinet Ministers (PDF file)

Canadian schoolteachers
New Brunswick Liberal Association MLAs
Members of the Executive Council of New Brunswick
People from Northumberland County, New Brunswick
Living people
Year of birth missing (living people)